The Canyons of the Escalante is a collective name for the erosional landforms created by the Escalante River and its tributariesthe Escalante River Basin. Located in southern Utah in the western United States, these sandstone features include high vertical canyon walls, numerous slot canyons, waterpockets (sandstone depressions containing temporary rainwater deposits), domes, hoodoos, natural arches and bridges.

Geography

The headwaters of the Escalante River are located on the slopes of the Aquarius Plateau, in Utah's Garfield County, just west of the town of Escalante. The Escalante River begins at the confluence of Birch Creek and North Creek, with the flow of Pine Creek added just below the town. The lower section of the river, southeast of Coyote Gulch, is now beneath the surface of Lake Powell.

Numerous side canyons also feed the main river, accounting for the large size of the basin.  From the west, the major tributaries are Harris Wash, Twentyfive Mile Creek, Coyote Gulch, Fortymile Gulch, and Fiftymile Creek, along with the smaller Phipps, Fence, and Scorpion, Davis, Clear, and Indian Creeks.  Most of these larger creeks flow from the top of the Kaiparowits Plateau or from the base of its eastern edge, the Straight Cliffs Formation.  An even greater number of tributaries flow in from the north and east, including Death Hollow and Calf Creeks, the combined Boulder and Deer Creeks, The Gulch, Wolverine and Silver Falls Creeks, and Choprock, Moody, Stevens, and Cow Canyons.  Streams from the north flow from Boulder Mountain, while those from the northeast originate in the Circle Cliffs area, near the Waterpocket Fold in Capitol Reef National Park.

Geology
The sandstone layers now exposed in the Canyons of the Escalante were deposited during the Mesozoic era, 180 to 225 million years ago, when this area was part of a large area of dunes.  Near the end of the Cretaceous period, about 80 million years ago, the entire western section of North America entered an era of uplift and mountain-building, an event known as the Laramide orogeny.  More recently, additional uplift formed the Colorado Plateau province.  These episodes of uplift raised the Aquarius Plateau to the extent that erosional solid forces were acting on the Escalante River Basin.  Wetter climates during the recent ice ages of the Pleistocene period contributed to the deep cutting of the canyon walls.

Sandstone exposed in canyons nearer to the Colorado River is typically from the Glen Canyon Group.  The dark red cliffs of Coyote Gulch, for example, are composed of Navajo Sandstone.  The lighter sandstone domes of Dance Hall Rock and Sooner Rocks are formed from the higher Entrada sandstone layer.  Due to the tilting of layers throughout the area, sandstone exposed at higher elevations near the town of Escalante (e.g. Deer Creek) may be from a lower layer, Wingate Sandstone.

Gallery

See also
 Calf Creek Falls
 Devils Garden
 Geology of the Bryce Canyon area - to the west of the basin
 Geology of the Capitol Reef area - to the east of the basin
 Hole in the Rock Trail - unpaved access road to the canyons
 Utah State Route 12 - only paved highway through the basin

References

Bibliography
 Hiking the Escalante, by Rudi Lambrechtse (1985), 
 Canyon Hiking Guide to the Colorado Plateau, by Michael R. Kelsey (1995), 
 Canyons of the Escalante, Trails Illustrated Map (1994),

External links

 Escalante Canyon at Utah.com (archive)
 History of the Escalante area

Canyons and gorges of Utah
Grand Staircase–Escalante National Monument
Canyons and gorges of Garfield County, Utah
Landforms of Kane County, Utah